For All Eternity is a 1917 British silent crime film directed by A.E. Coleby and Arthur Rooke and starring Janet Alexander, Malvina Longfellow and Arthur Rooke. Its plot concerns a man who is wrongly faced with execution for a murder he did not commit.

Cast
 Malvina Longfellow as Ella Morgan 
 Janet Alexander as Nurse Hillyer 
 Arthur Rooke as Desmond Leach 
 A.E. Coleby as Clifford Morgan 
 Richard Buttery   
 Joyce Templeton   
 N. Watt-Phillips

References

External links

1917 films
British silent feature films
British crime films
Films directed by Arthur Rooke
British black-and-white films
1917 crime films
1910s English-language films
1910s British films